Ram Narayan Ayodhya Higher Secondary School (राम नारायण अयोध्या उच्च माध्यमिक विद्यालय ) is the higher secondary school in Pipara Rural Municipality of Mahottari district in Nepal. It is located in the outskirts of Pipara village of Mahottari district in Nepal. It provides education up to junior college level in Management, Science, and Education streams. It is affiliated with National Examination Board (NEB) of Nepal. It is a government higher secondary school in Nepal. The new building of the school was built with the help of Indian Embassy in Nepal. Indian Consul General Gururaj Rao laid the foundation stone of the new building of the school on 23 November 2006. This school comes under Indo-Nepal Friendship Corporation. It is one of the important school in the region. The motto of the school is "From darkness lead me to light". The founder of the school was Ram Narayan Mishra. He was the former Minister for Industry and Commerce in the Royal government of Nepal in King Mahendra regime. He took his office of Ministry on 27 May 1959.

Campus 
It has a big playground in the campus of the school. The school has three sections primary, secondary and higher secondary.

References

Links 

https://commons.wikimedia.org/wiki/File:Ram_Narayan_Ayodhya_Higher_Secondary_School.jpg

Secondary schools in Nepal
Buildings and structures in Mahottari District